Two Eyed Jack was a Quarter Horse stallion and showhorse, and the leading all time sire of American Quarter Horse Association (or AQHA) Champions.

Life

Two Eyed Jack was foaled in 1961, a sorrel stallion bred by H. H. Mass. His sire was Two D Two, a descendant of Old Sorrel. Two D Two's dam was a linebred Little Joe mare, Little Joe being a son of Traveler. Triangle Tookie was a daughter of Grey Badger III, and a granddaughter of Grey Badger II. Tookie's dam traced back to Joe Hancock P-455. Triangle Tookie produced five AQHA Champions in her breeding career, including Two Eyed Jack.

Show career 
Howard Pitzer bought Two Eyed Jack in 1964 to cross on Pitzer's Pat Star Jr mares, after the horse had already earned many of his lifetime 217 AQHA open halter points. Owned by Pitzer, he earned the rest of those halter points, as well picking up another 46.5 points in Western Pleasure, 7 points in hunt seat, 3 more points in Western Riding, 3 in working cow horse and 6 points in reining. Those points earned Two Eyed Jack an AQHA Superior Halter Horse award along with his AQHA Championship and a Performance Register of Merit.

Pitzer had previously looked at Two Eyed Jack twice before purchasing him, once when he was ten days old, and then again when Jack was two at the Denver Stock Show. The second time, Pitzer told his companions that Jack was a nice horse, and that he'd make an "awful nice gelding."

Breeding record 
Two Eyed Jack is the all time leading sire of AQHA Champions, having sired 119 Champions. He also sired sixteen AQHA World Show Champions, as well as 242 Performance Register of Merit earners. He also sired three AQHA Supreme Champions. His daughter Vickie Lee Pine was the 1978 AQHA World Show Superhorse. Among his other offspring were Two Eyed Patti, Two Eyed Donna, Watch Joe Jack, Two Eyed Del, Deacon Jack, Two ID Bartender, Jack Eyed, and Two Jack.

Death and honors 
Two Eyed Jack stood 15.2½ hands high and weighed 1350 pounds. He died on March 2, 1991. He's buried on Pitzer's ranch in Ericson, Nebraska where Pitzer buried all his stallions.

He was inducted into the AQHA Hall of Fame in 1996. In 2007 Western Horseman magazine chose Two Eyed Jack as number four on their list of top ten ranch horse bloodlines.

Pedigree

Notes

References
 All Breed Pedigree Database Pedigree for Two Eyed Jack retrieved on June 20, 2007
 AQHA Hall of Fame accessed on November 11, 2010
 Denison, Jennifer and Ross Hecox (ed.) "The Top Ten Ranch Horse Bloodlines: Western Horseman ranks the top bloodlines used in today's working ranch remudas" Western Horseman October 2007 p. 34-41
 Dixon, Cathy ""He Would Make An Awful Nice Gelding":Howard Pitzer Talks About Two Eyed Jack" Quarter Horse Journal November 1979 p. 130-137
 Gaines, David "Two Eyed Jack is #1" Horseman August 1979 p. 22-30
 Swan, Kathy ed. Legends 3:Outstanding Quarter Horse Stallions and Mares Colorado Springs:Western Horseman 1997 
 Thornton, Larry "The Working Lines: Two Eyed Jack" Southern Horseman July 1990 p. 64-72
 Wohlfarth, Jenny "Last Rites" Quarter Horse Journal July 1996 p. 14

External links
 Two Eyed Jack at Quarter Horse Directory
 Two Eyed Jack at Quarter Horse Legends

American Quarter Horse show horses
American Quarter Horse sires
1961 animal births
1991 animal deaths
AQHA Hall of Fame (horses)